The Kyiv School of Ukrainian Language was founded as an institution to promote the external examination for the assessment of the education quality of Ukrainian secondary schools. Now it has developed into an educational language center.

About the school
Among the school's goals are services of teaching Ukrainian language and translation, including:
 Business Ukrainian
 Ukrainian for beginners
 Ukrainian for getting citizenship in Ukraine

External links
 

2008 establishments in Ukraine
Universities and colleges in Kyiv
Academic language institutions
Educational institutions established in 2008